Vance Edward Johnson (born March 13, 1963), is a former professional American football player who was selected by the Denver Broncos in the second round of the 1985 NFL Draft.

Playing career 
A 5'11", 174 lb. wide receiver, Johnson played college football at the University of Arizona, where he functioned as a multipurpose running back. In four seasons as a starter for the Wildcats, Johnson amassed 2,885 yards from scrimmage, 104 receptions, and 31 touchdowns, while also returning 62 kickoffs for 1,369 yards and another score.  Johnson was also a World-Class long jumper. In 1982, Johnson won the NCAA championship, as well as winning the gold medal at the Junior Pan American games. In 1984 Johnson just missed making the U.S. Olympic team, finishing fourth in the long jump at the 1984 U.S. Olympic Trials.

Johnson spent his entire NFL career for the Broncos from 1985 to 1995. He helped the Broncos to three Super Bowl appearances in the 1980s and had an impressive performance in Super Bowl XXI, recording five catches for 121 yards and a touchdown. His best season was in 1989, when he recorded 76 receptions for 1,095 yards and seven touchdowns. In his 11 seasons, Johnson recorded 415 receptions for 5,695 yards and 37 touchdowns, while also rushing 17 times for 44 yards. He also gained 689 yards on punt returns, and 1,027 yards returning kickoffs.

As of the 2017 NFL off-season, Johnson held at least three Broncos franchise records, including:
 Punt returns: playoffs (13), playoff season (7 in 1989; with Darrien Gordon)
 100+ yard receiving games: playoffs (3; with Demaryius Thomas)

Post-NFL life 
During a 1996 episode of The Oprah Winfrey Show, Johnson admitted to abusing his ex-wife and other women in his life.

Johnson owned a real estate company in Grand Junction, Colorado, and VJ's Outlaw Ribs in Parachute, Colorado, where he lived with his son, Scott. He was the owner of Epicurious in Grand Junction, but in November 2012 he abruptly closed it, leaving a note on the front door of the building, but offering no further explanation. Another son, Vaughn Edward, died from a motorcycle accident in 2007.

Johnson achieved sobriety in 2013. He is currently an advocate for addiction recovery for athletes post-career. He is also a rehabilitation ambassador with Americas Rehab Campus in Tucson, Arizona; using his experiences to help others.

Legacy 
In March 2019, Johnson's biography, Uncovered: Why Becoming Less Became Everything was released. For years he hid a serious alcohol and pill addiction that cost him everything he had. He recalled hitting rock bottom in the middle of a canyon in Colorado.  Johnson was interviewed for the March 27, 2019, edition of ABC Action News. He has been featured on the Oprah Winfrey Show, Maury Povich Show, the NFL Network, and the Wendy Williams Show.

Johnson was interviewed by William Slover of Pain Resource, about his struggles with addiction and chronic pain.

References

External links
 

1963 births
Living people
American football wide receivers
Arizona Wildcats football players
Denver Broncos players
Players of American football from Trenton, New Jersey